Franco Sanchírico (born January 21, 1984 in Córdoba) is an Argentine professional football player, who currently plays for UD Cornellà.

He played on the professional level in Primera División Argentina for Instituto Atlético Central Córdoba and for the Championnat National side Évian Thonon Gaillard FC.

References

External links
 

1984 births
Living people
Argentine footballers
Argentine expatriate footballers
Expatriate footballers in France
Argentine expatriate sportspeople in France
Instituto footballers
UE Cornellà players
Pan American Games medalists in football
Pan American Games gold medalists for Argentina
Association football defenders
Footballers at the 2003 Pan American Games
CD Masnou players
Medalists at the 2003 Pan American Games
Footballers from Córdoba, Argentina